Lycée Français René Cassin d'Oslo is a French international school in Oslo, Norway. The school serves the levels preschool through the final year of lycée, terminale (high school).

The school originated from the Vestheim School (Vestheim skole), founded by five people in 1891: Frederik Fredriksen, Nils Grøterud, Wilhelm Myhre, Hans H. K. Hougen, and Ole Jacobe Skattum. In 2017 the Norwegian state gave NOK 4 million to the school because it needed funding to pay for new teachers and school supplies.

See also
 France–Norway relations
 Lycée Français de Stavanger

References

External links
  Lycée Français René Cassin d'Oslo

Schools in Oslo
Oslo